The Brochet MB.70 was a two-seat light aircraft developed in France in the early 1950s for recreational flying and amateur construction.

Design and development
It was a high-wing braced monoplane of conventional configuration that seated the pilot and passenger in tandem within a fully enclosed cabin. It was fitted with fixed tailwheel undercarriage layout and was of all-wooden construction. Progress was hastened by the publication of a Service de l'Aviation Légère et Sportive requirement for a new light aircraft for French aeroclubs, and a series of development machines were built with a variety of different engines, eventually leading to the definitive Brochet MB.80.

Variants
 MB.70 - prototype powered by Salmson 9Adb radial (1 built)
 MB.71 - version with Minié 4.DC.32 engine (1 built)
 MB.72 - version with Continental A65 horizontally opposed four-cylinder engine (5 built)
 MB.73 - version with Continental A65-85 horizontally opposed four-cylinder engine (1 converted from the MB.70)
 MB.76 - version with Continental C90-14F horizontally opposed four-cylinder engine (1 built)

Units using this aircraft
Private and club pilots

Specifications (MB.72)

References

Notes

Bibliography

 
 
 
 
 

1950s French sport aircraft
Brochet aircraft
High-wing aircraft
Single-engined tractor aircraft
Aircraft first flown in 1950